The following is a list of awards and nominations received by American actress Cloris Leachman. During her career, she has won an  Academy Award, a BAFTA Award and was nominated for a Golden Globe for her role in The Last Picture Show. She has been nominated for a Primetime Emmy Award 22 times with eight wins, including Outstanding Supporting Actress in a Comedy Series in The Mary Tyler Moore Show (1974), 
Outstanding Lead Actress in a Miniseries or a Movie for A Brand New Life (1973), and Outstanding Guest Actress in a Comedy Series for Malcolm in the Middle, one in 2002 and the other in 2006.

Major associations

Academy Awards

BAFTA Awards

Daytime Emmy Awards

Golden Globe Awards

Screen Actors Guild Awards

Primetime Emmy Awards

Other awards and nominations

Genie Awards

Kansas City Film Critics Circle

National Board of Review

National Society of Film Critics

New York Film Critics Circle

American Academy of Achievement

Satellite Awards

References

See also
Cloris Leachman credits
Leachman, Cloris